Cruden Bay is a small village in Scotland, on the north coast of the Bay of Cruden in Aberdeenshire,  north of Aberdeen.

Just west of Slains Castle, Cruden Bay is said to have been the site of a battle in which the Scots under King Malcolm II defeated the Danes in 1012. Traditionally, the name was derived from the Gaelic Croch Dain (Slaughter of Danes).

Today, Cruden Bay attracts tourists with its hotels and golf course. It has a long, unspoiled, beach made famous by Norwegian aviator Tryggve Gran who made the first solo flight across the North Sea.

Literary associations

The village has associations with various figures in literature.

Dr Samuel Johnson and James Boswell were guests at Slains Castle in 1773. Johnson said that "no man can see with indifference" the sea chasm known as the Bullers of Buchan, which is near the village.

Dun Bay, or Yellow Rock is also near the Bullers of Buchan, and is associated with Walter Scott's The Antiquary.

Bram Stoker was a regular visitor between 1893 and 1910. Because he was a part-time writer, his Cruden Bay holidays provided him with the largest amount of spare time to write his books. He stayed at the Kilmarnock Arms Hotel in 1893 and 1894, and thereafter in cottages in Cruden Bay and Whinnyfold. The early chapters of Dracula were written in Cruden Bay, and possibly most of the rest of it was too. He also set two novels in and around the village, The Watter's Mou' (1895) and The Mystery of the Sea (1902).

James Macpherson's poem The Highlander (1758) takes the battle of Cruden as its model.

Early area history

Earliest nearby human traces are evident in nearby Catto Long Barrow, a massive stone structure now surrounded by agricultural fields.

The nearby cliff top Slains Castle was begun in 1597 and abandoned and un-roofed for tax purposes in the 1920s. Bishop's Bridge spans Cruden Water and dates from 1697.

William Hay, 18th Earl of Erroll, established the fishing community of Port Erroll in the 1840s and 1850s. A functional harbour at the mouth of the Water of Cruden was added in the 1870s. Before that a tiny, long-abandoned hamlet of rudimentary fisher cottages, simply known as Ward, stood exposed on top of Ward Hill, just above the harbour site. There was also a parish school since 1606, housed in the elegant two-storey [(Erroll Schoolhouse]) from 1834; the Presbyterian Church dedicated to Saint Olaf or commonly called the Old Kirk—built in 1776, with distinctive conical towers added in 1833—and Saint James Episcopal Church, notably the first structure designed by architect William Hay on top of Chapel Hill in 1842.

Fishing community and seaside resort

Port Erroll developed as a fishing community to some extent but the tidal nature of the harbour restricted the size of craft which could operate from it and the village missed out on the herring boom. Tourism provided another source of income for the village. Even before the coming of the railway, the long pink curve of the Bay of Cruden sands and scenic cliffscapes to the north were attracting visitors and a small seaside resort was grafting itself onto the fishing community. The Cruden Bay Golfing Society, founded in 1791, played on the open links.

The coming and going of the railway
The railway brought grandeur but not lasting prosperity, to Cruden Bay. The Boddam branch line from Ellon to Boddam near Peterhead was opened in 1897, along with the golf course and the 55-bedroom Cruden Bay Hotel two years later. The Cruden Bay Hotel Tramway was added linking the station and hotel. The Great North of Scotland Railway Company promoted Cruden Bay as a Brighton of the North, only twelve hours from London and an ideal escape for gentry and nouveau riche; despite initial enthusiasm, neither railway nor hotel prospered. The railway was closed to passengers in 1932 and in 1939 the hotel was requisitioned as an army hospital and not re-opened after the war and demolished around 1950. Cruden Bay remains a golfing destination and the village sustains three smaller hotels. Although the harbour area and the local primary school are still styled "Port Errol", the railway adventure put the name Cruden Bay firmly on the map.

Cruden Bay today
The 1950s and 1960s was a period of rapid population decline for Cruden Bay but the coming of North Sea oil to north-east Scotland, with its attendant jobs and families looking for places to settle, reinvigorated the village; thereafter, the population rose again, with new housing added near the defunct brickworks, the site of the demolished Cruden Bay Hotel and along the water of Cruden at Morrison Place. These days Cruden Bay serves mainly as a dormitory village for the important settlements of Peterhead to the north and Aberdeen to the south. The eighteenth century timbered salmon station still operates and some seasonal commercial fishing continues. 

Cruden Bay has a medium-sized primary school. Secondary pupils are bussed to nearby Peterhead Academy. There are a few small shops, a chemist/newsagent, a post office/hardware, a craft shop and a general store. There is also a Chinese takeaway, a medical surgery and a library. There are also many sports facilities, tennis courts, and two football pitches. The school and public hall house a number of youth groups such as Girlguiding UK. There is a Congregational Church in the village centre and just outside the village there is a Scottish Episcopalian Church and a Church of Scotland parish. Cruden Bay is not far from the towns of Ellon and Peterhead, and is about 30 minutes drive from Aberdeen City. 

Holiday makers are served by 2 hotels, a pub and bed and breakfasts. Attractions for visitors include the beach, the golf course of the Cruden Bay Golf Club (ranked #29 nationwide).

Oil pipeline
It pumps crude oil from the Forties oilfield to Whinnyfold, then by overland pipeline to Grangemouth.

Amenities
 Primary school with pre-school nursery
 Library
 Post office / General store
 Newsagent / General store
 Medical Practice
 Deodorant store 
 Pharmacy
 Golf course
 Bed and breakfasts
 Self-catering accommodation
 Two hotels
 Public house
 Chinese take-away
 Gift shop (owned by local artist)

See also
 Bogbrae
 Laeca Burn
 Catto Long Barrow

References

External links

 Cruden Bay Tramway page at the LNER Encyclopedia

Seaside resorts in Scotland
Villages in Aberdeenshire